Helen Mary Josephine Alford (born 1 May 1964) is an economist and dean of social sciences at the Pontifical University of Saint Thomas Aquinas in Rome, Italy.

Education and appointments 
She was born in London and graduated with a doctorate in engineering from the University of Cambridge. Alford taught at Cambridge after receiving her doctorate. She entered the order of Dominican Sisters of Saint Catherine of Siena in 1994. Alford teaches courses on economic ethics, the history of technology, labor politics, and Catholic social thought; most of her teaching since becoming a Dominican has been at the Angelicum, a university founded and administered by members of that order. Her first assignment there was in 1996; in 2009, she was named full professor. She was elected dean of the social sciences faculty in May 2001 and re-elected for three further terms. She later became vice-rector and then, once again, dean of social sciences in 2021.

Research and publishing 
Her numerous publications address questions of social ethics, health equity, and the responsible distribution of wealth. She also contributed many editorials to the journal OIKONOMIA: rivista di etica e scienze sociali. A selection of her publications follows:

 Fondare la responsabilità sociale d'impresa: contributi dalle scienze umane e dal pensiero sociale cristiano. Rome: Città nuova, 2008.
 Rediscovering abundance: interdisciplinary essays on wealth, income, and their distribution in the catholic social tradition. Notre Dame, Indiana: University of Notre Dame Press, 2006.
 Managing as if faith mattered: Christian social principles in the modern organization (with Michael Naughton). Notre Dame, Indiana: University of Notre Dame Press, 2001, 2008.
 Responsabilità sociale d'impresa e dottrina sociale della Chiesa cattolica. Milan: F. Angeli, 2010.
 Il carcere degli esclusi: le condizioni civili degli stranieri nelle carceri italiane (with Alberto Lo Presti). Cinisello Balsamo: Edizioni Paoline, 2005.
Preaching justice. Contributions of Dominican sisters to social ethics in the twentieth century (with Francesco Compagnoni and Mary McAleese), several volumes. Dublin: Dominican Publications, 2016.

References 

1964 births
21st-century English theologians
Alumni of the University of Cambridge
Catholic social teaching
Dominican Sisters
Living people
New Blackfriars people
Academic staff of the Pontifical University of Saint Thomas Aquinas
Women economists